Frédéric Etsou-Nzabi-Bamungwabi, C.I.C.M. (3 December 1930, Belgian Congo – 6 January 2007, Leuven, Belgium) was cardinal and Archbishop of Kinshasa, Democratic Republic of the Congo (DRC). He was the DRC's foremost Catholic prelate from 1991 until his death in 2007.

Biography
Educated by Catholic missionaries, Frédéric Etsou joined the CICM missionaries in 1959. He was ordained as a priest on 13 July 1958, and assigned to the city of Leopoldville. He later studied sociology and theology in France and Belgium before returning to Congo in the late 1960s.

Etsou became Archbishop of Mbandaka-Bikoro on 11 November 1977, and Archbishop of Kinshasa in 1990. He was proclaimed a Cardinal-Priest of S. Lucia a Piazza d'Armi by Pope John Paul II on 28 June 1991, succeeding the first Zairean Cardinal, Joseph-Albert Cardinal Malula. He took charge of Congo's Catholic Church in the final years of the rule of longtime dictator Mobutu Sese Seko, and it was said at the time that he was chosen with Mobutu's support. After Mobutu was overthrown in 1997, Etsou spoke out against what he described as the strong-arm tactics of the new leader, Laurent Kabila, the father of the current president of the DRC, Joseph Kabila, who took power in 2001 following his father's assassination. 

Etsou was one of the cardinal electors who participated in the 2005 papal conclave that selected Pope Benedict XVI.

In a statement to the Congolese nation and to the international community released on 11 November 2006 from Paris, the Cardinal seemed to doubt the independence of the country's Independent Electoral Commission (headed by a Catholic priest, Apollinaire Malu Malu) and the outcome of the runoff of the first direct presidential election in the more than 40-year history of the country pitting the incumbent Kabila against his challenger vice president Jean-Pierre Bemba. He warned of what he called international meddling and accused several officials with Kabila's transitional government of stealing from the state treasury and demanded their resignations. These statement created tension in the capital city, the stronghold of the challenger, whose family is close to the Cardinal who also hails from the same Équateur Province. The results of the second round of the presidential election, published on 15 November 2006, gave the incumbent a win with 58.05% and his opponent 41.95%.

Death
Frédéric Etsou-Nzabi-Bamungwabi died of diabetes and pneumonia at the University Hospital in Leuven, Belgium on 6 January 2007, aged 76. He was buried in Kinshasa.

References

External links
 
 
 Frédéric Cardinal Etsou-Nzabi-Bamungwabi bio
 Profile

1930 births
2007 deaths
People from Mongala
Democratic Republic of the Congo cardinals
Deaths from diabetes
Deaths from pneumonia in Belgium
20th-century cardinals
Cardinals created by Pope John Paul II
Roman Catholic archbishops of Kinshasa
Roman Catholic archbishops of Mbandaka-Bikoro